Bergaris ruficeps is a species of moth of the family Cossidae. It is found in Vietnam.

References

Moths described in 1929
Zeuzerinae